The Dubai Police Force is the police force of the Emirate of Dubai, United Arab Emirates. The Dubai Police Force has over 17,500 sworn members responsible for policing an area of 4,114 square kilometres and a population of 2.8 million people. They come under the jurisdiction of the ruler of Dubai.

History
The Dubai Police Force was founded on 1 June 1956 in Naif (a locality in the Deira side of Dubai) with only 29 members, with the first police station being known as 'Naif Fort'. The size of the force increased gradually, to 105 in 1960 and to 430 by 1967. In 1973, the force moved its headquarters to their current location of Al-Twar, on Al-Etihad Street in Dubai. At present, a further move is being planned to a newly constructed headquarters, again in Deira.

The Dubai Police Force strives to be 'most progressive' of all Arabic police forces and aims for high education standards amongst its personnel. The force was the first to use many new law enforcement techniques, including electronic finger printing and DNA testing. The force was also the first to use GPS systems to locate stolen vehicles. The force has announced that it plans to deploy its first robot police officer by May 2017, and that their ambition is to have 25 percent of the force consist of robotic officers by 2030, as well as to operate a "smart" police station that "won't require human employees". In addition, the force was the first to create a human rights department, as well as the first to employ a community policing programme.

The new headquarters for the Dubai police is planned to be constructed in Deira, and the premises were designed with several considerations in mind. As well as making easy access for both officers and members of the public a priority, the new design aims to separate the departments into different areas. The building is also to feature a central, multi-level internal space, and is designed to fit in with the developing architecture of surrounding Dubai, the Dubai Police Force describe it as a 'distinguished constructional conception'.

The police force closely cooperates with civil defence and ambulance personnel.

After many years, the logo/emblem of the police force was modified in January 2018.

In 2023, the United Arab Emirates’ first ever all-female SWAT team competed in the SWAT World Challenge for the Dubai Police. The team, endorsed by first lieutenant Yasser al Zarouni, is made up of “jiujitsu champions and keen-eyed sharpshooters” such as lieutenant Latifa al-Salman and sergeant Sheikha Ali Abdullah, as well as nine additional members.

Dubai Police Commanders in Chief

Departments

The Dubai Police Force operates under a general commander and his deputy, who in turn work under the police chief and his own deputy. The general commander forms part of an organisational office which, with a decision making support centre, organises fifteen separate departments:

General Department of Operations
This is the heart of the Dubai Police Force. Round the clock telephone lines help to electronically control all patrols from this department, with 2,000 land lines and 178 fax machines, and utilising wireless equipment to locate both car and foot patrols. The department also coordinates all emergency responses as well as search and rescue operations on land and sea.

General Department of Artificial Intelligence
This department is another integral part of the police force, as well as being the most recent department to be created. It was established in 2001 as part of the aims of Sheikh Mohammed Bin Rashid Al-Maktoum, Prime Minister of the United Arab Emirates, to form a totally electronic government. In 2008, 30% of UAE national are assigned to the work in the E-services Department to fulfill their duty. In 2014, Director-General Khalid Nasser Alrazooqi introduced Google Glass to the police force to issue fines and identify wanted cars. In 2018, the department was renamed to correspond to the new government direction towards artificial intelligence.

General Department of Criminal Investigation
This the primary crime fighting department of the Dubai Police, its objectives are laid out by as follows:

1. Dealing with petty crime (quarrels, swearing, defamation, etc.).
2. Dealing with offences against the person, such as murder, rape, armed robbery, kidnapping, etc.
3. Dealing with organised crime (drug trafficking, money laundering, internationally wanted criminals etc.).
4. Social services, such as lost property, things found, certificates of good conduct, licences of all kinds etc.
5. Employing scientific evidence (such as Forensic Medicine, fingerprints, documents, arsons, chemical analysis, firearms etc.).
6. Employing identity recognition means (such as fingerprints, the DNA, criminal records etc.).
7. Crime prevention methods (such guidance, directives, follow-up, statistical projections, periodicals etc.).
8. Contains the Dubai section of the International Criminal Police (Interpol).

General Department of Forensic Science and Criminology 
The criminal laboratory opened for the Dubai Police in 1982. At that time, it was affiliated with the General Department of Criminal Investigations. Given the increase and expansion of the scope of work in the field of forensic evidence and the multiplying of criminal work departments, in 2000 AD, the laboratory was renamed the General Administration of Forensic Evidence.

On April 14, 2007, the name of the General Administration of Criminal Evidence and Criminology was changed because it also was using science to investigate crime in addition to its administrative tasks. This science studies criminal phenomena and their causes as related to the person or the environment surrounding him or her in order to determine the motives leading to crime and to combat it and limit its spread. Forensic science employs several disciplines, including psychology and sociology.

On March 30, 2016, His Highness Sheikh Mohammed bin Rashid Al Maktoum, Vice President and Prime Minister of the UAE and Ruler of Dubai, may God protect and preserve him, opened the new General Department of Criminal Evidence and Criminology. His Highness said, “The General Command of Dubai Police has become all its centers and its departments are a beacon of science, learning, training, and the application of international educational curricula and programs specialized in police, security and legal sciences." His Highness affirmed that the General Command of the Dubai Police in cooperation and coordination with police leaders in the state and the Ministry of Interior will continue to watch over the security and stability of Dubai's society.

The Department consists of nine sub departments: 
 Digital Forensics Department   
 Specialized Forensic Evidence Department
 Crime Scene Department
 Fingerprint Department
 Forensic Medicine Department
 Training and Development Department 
 Administrative Affairs Department
 Technical Affairs Department

Organizational structure

Commander-in-Chief of Dubai Police

Deputy Commander-in-Chief of Dubai Police 
 Headquarter Regulatory Office
 Police Judiciary Council
 Resilience Center
 Internal Audit Office
 Esaad Card Center
 Governance and Compliance

Assistant Commander-in-Chief for Community Happiness and Logistic Support Affairs 

 Protocol Department
 Institutional Development Office
 General Department of Community Happiness
 General Department of Logistic Support

Assistant Commander-in-Chief for Ports Affairs 

 Institutional Development Office
 General Department of Airports Security
 Ports Police Station
 Dubai Police Air Wing

Assistant Commander -in-Chief for Academic affairs and training 

 Hemaya Schools Office
 Institutional Development Office
 Dubai Police Academy
 General Department of Training

Assistant Commander-in-Chief for Excellence and Pioneering Affairs 

 Institutional Development Office
 General Department of Excellence and Pioneering
 General Department of Human Rights in Dubai Police
 Future Foresight And Decision Support Center

Assistant Commander-in-Chief for Operations 

 Institutional Development Office
 General Department of Traffic
 General Department of Operations
 General Department of Organization Protective Security and Emergency
 General Department of Transport and Rescue

Assistant Commander-in-Chief for Administration affairs 

 Dubai Police Health Center
 Institutional Development Office
 Center for Quality of life
 Financial Control Department
 General Department of Administrative Affairs
 General Department of Human Resources
 General Department of Artificial Intelligence
 General Department of Finance

Assistant Commander-in-Chief for Criminal Investigation 

 Institutional Development Office
 Oyoon Center
 General Department of Forensic Science and Criminology
 General Department of Anti-Narcotics
 General Department of Punitive and Correctional Establishments
 General Department of Criminal Investigations (CID)
 Institutional Development Office (Police Stations)
 Bur Dubai Police station
 Al Muraghabat Police Station
 Nad Al Sheba Police Station
 Al Rifaa Police Station
 Jebel Ali Police Station
 Hata Police Station
 Al Qusais Police Station
 Al Rashidyia Police Station
 Al Barsha Police Station
 Naif Police Station
 Al Khawaneej Police Station
 Dubai Mounted Police
 Criminal Information Department

Police stations 
There are currently twelve Dubai police stations in the city.

 Al-Rifaa
 This station was established in the 1970s to secure the Bur Dubai region. It has been reopened in different premises on two occasions, 1979 and 1992.
 Al-Muraqqabat
 This station was established in 1974.
 Al-Rashidiyah
 Al-Rashidiyah was created in 1976 as part of Al-Muraqqabat, however it became an independent station in 1984, and was moved to newer premises in 2000.
 Naif
 The original headquarters of the Dubai Police force, Naif Fort was constructed in 1929, and was used as a prison until the founding of the force in 1956.
 Al-Qusais
 Al-Qusais was founded in 1977 and moved to new premises in 1999.
 Hatta
 This station was established in 1974, and also moved to new premises, this time in 1976.
 Nad Al-Sheba
 This station opened in 1994 in Zabeel, though subsequently moved.
 Jebel Ali
 This station was built in 1971, and renovated in 2000.
 Ports
 Ports police station was also built in 1971, and watches over the Rashid Port.
 Bur Dubai
 This station was founded in 1979.
 Al-Barsha
 This new station opened in 2014 and covers the new developments in Al-Barsha and the surrounding locales.
Al-Khawaneej
 This new station opened in 2022 and covers the new developments in Al-Khawaneej and the surrounding areas, the stations is considered to be a smart police station and is one of the different branches of the smart police stations located around in Dubai.

Services 
Dubai Police provides a variety of services to the public of which some main services are:

File Criminal Complaint 
This service allows customers to report cases of different offenses (such as: breach of trust, insulting, insult via mobile, threat, hassle, assault) and people whom benefit from this service are people who are affected by crime.

eCrime 
This Self-Service allows the public to record a complaint regarding cybercrimes, whether for their persons or for their properties. This service is specific to crimes happened within the geographical scope of Dubai city and people who benefit from this service are people who are affected by ecrimes.

Tourist Police 
This Service allows customers to submit a communication or complaint to the Tourist Police Department , using Dubai Police Website, in person, using email, or calling toll-free telephone number (901). They may also follow up on the complaint and to resolve it by providing advices and to respond to security queries.

Criminal Status of Financial Cases 
This service allows the public to inquire about their criminal cases in financial cases registered in Dubai Police Stations only, in addition to travel ban.

Fines Inquiry and Payment 
This service allows the public to inquire and pay traffic fines registered under their vehicle or driving license and people who benefit from this service are individuals and organizations.

Lost Item Certificate 
This service enables customers to obtain a lost item certificate in relevance to documents, official and non-official certificates, lost vehicle plate numbers, money, goods, and other similar items that are of importance to the customers.

Police Clearance Certificate 
This service enables community members to obtain a certificate from the police proving their good conduct in the United Arab Emirates- from a security and criminal point of view, in order to present it to official authorities that request this type of certificate; for work, study, immigration, obtaining a license, or any such matters.

Home Security 
This service allows villa residents to utilize patrols available in neighborhoods, to monitor their homes while they are outside the country.

On the Go Service 
The Dubai Police General Command, in cooperation with the ENOC Group, launched in 2015 the  "On the go" initiative, concerned with issuing reports of minor traffic accidents in record time. The service is provided within 22 petrol stations located around Dubai with more than 250 trained employees to provide these services.

The initiative will help drivers in the city to issue simple accident reports in case of accidents, while recently issuing unknown accident report has been added to the services provided within the initiative.

Uniform, equipment, and vehicles 

The standard uniform of a Dubai police officer is an olive green shirt with a red band running under the left arm and looped through the left epaulette, a dark green beret with a golden badge depicting the police force's seal, olive green trousers, and black boots. Female officers are required to wear a hijab.

Alternatively, officers wear a light brown shirt and trousers, though the rest of the uniform remains the same. High-ranking officers wear a combination cap and rank badges on the collar, together with their light brown uniform.

Officers carry semi-automatic handguns such as the Caracal and SIG Sauer pistols. The Special Emergency Unit uses a varied arsenal of weapons such as the MP5 submachine gun, Glock 17 pistols, Ithaca 37 shotguns, M4 and M16 variants, X26 tasers, flash grenades, and other weapons depending on the situation.

Dubai Police Force vehicles are painted with a white and dark green colour scheme, with blue emergency lights. Every Dubai police vehicle has the force's website and email addresses printed on it. General duties and patrols are carried out by Chevrolet, Toyota, Mitsubishi, Mazda, and Nissan vehicles. In 2013, the force fielded new eco-friendly patrol cars. In addition to cars, the force also employs motorcycles, helicopters, and boats.

Exotic vehicles

The Dubai Police Force operates a variety of performance cars, luxury cars, supercars, and even concept cars for policing. The rarity and cost of the vehicles, as well as their unusual role in policing, tend to attract the interest of foreigners. However, the belief that they are standard patrol cars or used in pursuits is false: the exotic cars are only used for traffic enforcement in tourist areas, and policing in the rest of the city, including responses to emergencies and pursuits, is conducted by regular patrol units in cheaper patrol cars.

The Dubai Police Force's exotic vehicles include:

 Aston Martin One-77
 Aston Martin Vantage
 Lykan HyperSport
 Audi R8
 Bentley Continental GT
 Bentley Bentayga
 BMW i3
 BMW i8
 BMW M6 Gran Coupé
 Bugatti Veyron
 Carbon Motors E7
 Cadillac CT5
 Chevrolet Camaro SS
 Chevrolet Corvette
 Dodge Viper
 Ferrari FF
 Ford Mustang GT by Roush Racing
 Genesis GV80
 Hongqi E-HS9
 Jaguar F-Type
 Hummer H3
 Lamborghini Aventador LP 700-4 
 Lamborghini Urus
 Lexus GS 
 Lexus RC F
 Maserati GranTurismo
 McLaren 570S
 McLaren 650S
 McLaren MP4-12C
 Mercedes-AMG GT R
 Mercedes-AMG GT 63 S
 Mercedes-Benz G63 AMG by Brabus
 Mercedes-Benz SL63 AMG
 Mercedes-Benz SLS AMG
 Mitsubishi Pajero GLS
 Nissan GT-R
 Porsche 918
 Porsche Panamera Turbo S
 Pagani Huayra
 Rolls-Royce Wraith
 Toyota Land Cruiser
 Toyota GR Supra

Motorcycles
 Yamaha R1
 Yamaha R6
 Hoversurf Scorpion 3 hoverbike

Academy

The Dubai Police Academy was founded in 1987, and was granted autonomy from the police force as long as it retains some affiliation with Dubai Police General Headquarters. It was fully inaugurated in 1989 in the presence of Sheikh Maktoum Bin Rashid Al-Maktoum. In 1992, degrees offered by the academy were made equal to degrees from universities.

The first class was from 1987 to 1988, and consisted of 51 cadets and 30 full-time students, some of whom were existing police officers. They graduated in 1991. During the academic year of 1996–1997, students from Arabic countries such as Yemen, Oman, Lebanon and Palestinian Territories were admitted.

It offers several degrees, such as License in Law and Police sciences, Masters in law (with several concentrations), and Doctoral degree in law.

It maintains international standards of teaching and employs modern teaching methodology including e-learning and has revamped its website in September 2012 to introduce e-learning features.

Museum

The Dubai Police Museum, located at Al-Mulla Plaza, opened on 19 November 1987. It comprises three exhibit halls, as well as documenting anti-drug efforts of the police force, and the force's prison systems. On 19 November 1987, the International Council of Museums placed the museum on the record of Arab Museums.

Cycling team

The Dubai Police Cycling Team was established in April 1977 by the decision of Colonel Abdullah Khalfan Belhoul, former Commander-in-Chief of Dubai Police, who ordered the formation of the cycling team to participate in races being held by the Sports Police Federation. Two teams of 'local amateurs' and 'professional women' were created for team members to participate in local and international races. The team uses professional bicycles dedicated to the sport and the team is supported by the Italian company Colnago, which specializes in the manufacturing of bicycles and their supplies.

These participations aim to spread the culture of the sport, establish the principles of fair competition and guide members of society towards exercise to promote the concept of 'the positive spirit'.

General statistics

Local and international participation

Community service medal 

Lieutenant-General His Highness Sheikh Saif bin Zayed, deputy Prime Minister and Minister of Interior has awarded the Community Service Medal for the Dubai Police Cycling Team, after achieving first place at the level of teams and individuals.

The team had achieved a number of advanced positions for the men's and women's categories in the second 50-year Emirati amateur race - men, and the 50-year elite race - women, as part of the sixth edition of the Salam Championship.

Al Wathba Cycling Race 

At Abu Dhabi Sports Council's Al Wathba cycling race the team dominated various categories in the race that took place on 23 October 2020.

UAE Cycling Federation race 

The Team dominated the first three spots in the race in the armatures category for female residents, the race that was for 50 kilometers and organized in Umm Al Quwain in April 2021.

Returning to sports race 
In a race which was organized by Dubai Sports Council Dubai Police cyclists earned the top spots in the race after Yaser Al Baloushi wons the first and Omar Darwish won the second.

Daman Cycling Challenge 
In February 2021 Dubai Police Women Cycling team dominated the Daman Cycling Challenge after winning the top 8 spots in the race.

Dubai Smart Police Stations
Merged content from Dubai Smart Police Stations to here. See Talk:Dubai Police Force

Smart Police Stations (SPS) are a series of new self-service centers offering smart police services across Dubai. The service enables customers to apply digitally for many services, such as criminal, traffic, certification and others, without a traditional visit to the police station.

History
The stations are located in new areas and property developments. The stations allow customers skip queues and complete transactions digitally, and with no human contact. The force aims to increase its use of artificial intelligence and reduce police stations visits by 80 percent.

2022 
Dubai Smart Police Stations (SPS), the world's only unmanned police stations, smartly processed 107,719 transactions, including lodging 16,083 reports, last year.

Services
There are 22 SPS stations and they operate 24 hours a day and operate daily, including on weekends and holidays. The stations provide services in six languages, and they provide services in the following categories:
Criminal Services: Customers are able to register for a request for victim support, reporting a bounce cheque, filing a labor complaint, getting aid from the police eye, filing criminal complaints, request for home security, inquire about police reports and report human trafficking.
Traffic Services: The SPS offers the services of reissuing a traffic accident report, applying for a traffic status certificate, applying for changing a vehicle color and to pay fines online.
Certificates and Permits: The customers can apply for lost item certificates, good conduct certificates, corpse entry permits, night work permits, road closure permits, clearance certificates and To Whom It May Concern certificates.
Community Services: For the community, the SPS allows customers to apply for tourist security services, events security requests, request for leaders at your service, job vacancies, heart patient services, delivery of found items and the search for lost items.

Smart Police Stations Locations 
There are currently many smart police stations located all around Dubai:

-         City Walk SPS

-         La Mer SPS

-         Dubai Design District SPS

-         Al Seef SPS

-         Palm Jumeirah SPS

-         Arabian Ranches SPS Walk-in

-         Al Barsha Police Station

-         Jebel Ali Police Station

-         Al Muraqqabat Police Station

-         Dubai Silicon Oasis SPS Walk-in

-         DAFZA SPS

-         HQ Reception

-         Hatta Suburban Point

-         AL Eyas Suburban Point

-         Al Lesaily Suburban Point

-         Expo SPS

-         Al Khawaneej Police Station

Controversies
In 2011 British tourist Lee Bradley Brown was arrested by the Dubai police and died in prison after 6 days of custody in a controversial manner.

Police have detained protesters many times. Protests are not allowed in the UAE and there is a law banning criticism of the government and police. Furthermore, a US citizen and a group of others were arrested in 2013 after they made a parody video of Dubai.

See also
Law enforcement in the United Arab Emirates

References

External links

 Dubai police site
 https://web.archive.org/web/20090313074038/http://www.captaris.com/news_and_events/case_studies/Dubai_Police.html
 https://www.bbc.co.uk/news/world-middle-east-23381448

Dubai Police Force